Yang Li (born 26 February 1993) is a Chinese footballer who currently plays for Jiangsu in the Chinese Women's Super League. Her impressive form has subsequently drawn comparisons of her to revered Chinese striker Sun Wen.

International career 
Yang was first called up to the Chinese women's national team ahead of the 2014 Four Nations Tournament. She scored twice on her debut on 13 October 2014 in a 3–1 win against Mexico during the tournament. At the 2014 AFC Women's Asian Cup, Yang was joint top goalscorer with Park Eun-sun with six goals in five games as the team finished third place and qualified for the 2015 FIFA Women's World Cup. She was ruled out of the 2015 FIFA Women's World Cup right before the tournament started due to recurring injuries.

International goals

Honours

International
China PR national football team
Four Nations Tournament: 2014, 2016

Individual
AFC Women's Asian Cup Top Goalscorer: 2014

References

External links 

 
 Profile at Chinese Football Association (CFA) 

Chinese women's footballers
Living people
1993 births
China women's international footballers
People from Lianyungang
Footballers from Jiangsu
Women's association football forwards
Footballers at the 2014 Asian Games
Footballers at the 2016 Summer Olympics
Olympic footballers of China
2019 FIFA Women's World Cup players
Asian Games competitors for China